Choo Choo is a baby talk term for a train or the locomotive of a train.

Choo Choo or Choo-Choo may also refer to:

Nickname 
Charlie Brackins (born 1932), American football quarterback
Charlie Brown (boxer) (born 1958), American retired boxer
Choo-Choo Coleman (1937–2016), American retired Major League Baseball player
Charlie Justice (halfback) (1924–2003), American College Football Hall of Fame and National Football League player
Michael Portillo (born 1953), British journalist, broadcaster, and former Conservative Party politician and Cabinet Minister
Gene Roberts (American football) (1923–2009), American National Football League player
Harry Romero, American disc jockey and record producer

Other uses 
Choo-Choo!, a 1932 Our Gang comedy short film
Choo Choo Bar, an Australian candy bar
Choo-Choo (Top Cat), a character in the animated series Top Cat
Choo-Choo, an Animatronic Bear character in The Rock-afire Explosion music stage show
Choo-Choo Charlie, an animated mascot for Good & Plenty candy

See also
Chattanooga Choo Choo (disambiguation)

Lists of people by nickname